James Hosie (1876–unknown) was a Scottish footballer who played in the Football League for Blackburn Rovers, Bristol City, Manchester City and Stockport County.

References

1876 births
Scottish footballers
English Football League players
Association football defenders
Glasgow Perthshire F.C. players
Reading F.C. players
Blackburn Rovers F.C. players
Manchester City F.C. players
Stockport County F.C. players
Bristol City F.C. players
Year of death missing